Randolph "Randy" Lee Ragan (born June 7, 1959) is a former Canadian elite professional soccer player, who was considered one of the top midfield players in Canada in the 1980s.

Professional
Ragan attended Simon Fraser University where he played on the men's soccer team.  In 1980, the Toronto Blizzard of the North American Soccer League drafted Ragan.  He played for the Blizzard from 1980 to 1984, including one indoor NASL season. In 1986, he played with the Blizzard during their 1986 season in the National Soccer League. In 1987, he again played for the Blizzard in the Canadian Soccer League where he was a 1987 First Team All Star.  In 1990 he played with the Victoria Vistas. In 1991, he spent one season with the North York Rockets.

National team

In 1976, Ragan played for the Canada U-20 men's national soccer team during its unsuccessful qualification campaign for the 1977 FIFA World Youth Championship.  He went on to play 40 times for the Canadian national team.  His first game was a 4–0 win over New Zealand on September 15, 1980.  His last was a 1–0 loss to China on August 31, 1986.  His greatest achievement came when he played all three games for Canada during the 1986 FIFA World Cup.  Ragan also played nine games with the Canadian Olympic team and was a member of the 1984 Olympic Canadian soccer team which went to the quarterfinals of the 1984 Olympic soccer tournament.

In April 2002, Ragan was inducted into the Canada Soccer Hall of Fame.

Coach
He is now a contracts manager in Guelph and coaches the Guelph Royals 1994 Boys A team who play in the Western Ontario Youth Soccer League.  In 2007, he served as an assistant with the University of Guelph men's soccer team.  On May 16, 2008, the university hired Ragan as the head coach of the Gryphons Women's team.

References

External links
 / Canada Soccer Hall of Fame
NASL stats

 
 
 

1959 births
Living people
1986 FIFA World Cup players
Soccer people from Alberta
Canada men's international soccer players
Canada Soccer Hall of Fame inductees
Canadian soccer coaches
Canadian soccer players
Canadian Soccer League (1987–1992) players
Association football midfielders
Footballers at the 1984 Summer Olympics
North American Soccer League (1968–1984) indoor players
North American Soccer League (1968–1984) players
North York Rockets players
Olympic soccer players of Canada
People from Big Lakes County
Simon Fraser Clan men's soccer players
Toronto Blizzard (1986–1993) players
Toronto Blizzard (1971–1984) players
Canada men's youth international soccer players
Canadian National Soccer League players
CONCACAF Championship-winning players
Guelph Gryphons men's soccer coaches
Guelph Gryphons women's soccer coaches
Victoria Vistas players